Nong Song Hong is a district (amphoe) in the southern part of Khon Kaen province, northeastern Thailand.

Geography
Neighboring districts are (from the west clockwise): Phon, Non Sila, Ban Phai. and Pueai Noi of Khon Kaen Province; Na Chueak of Maha Sarakham province; Na Pho, Phutthaisong and Ban Mai Chaiyaphot of Buriram province; and Prathai of Nakhon Ratchasima province.

History
The minor district (king amphoe) was created on 1 January 1962, when the four tambons: Takua Pa, Nong Mek, Non That, and Khuemchat were split off from Phon district. It was upgraded to a full district on 16 July 1963.

Administration
The district is divided into 12 subdistricts (tambons), which are further subdivided into 135 villages (mubans). Nong Song Hong is a township (thesaban tambon) which covers parts of tambon Nong Song Hong. There are a further 12 tambon administrative organizations (TAO).

References

External links
amphoe.com

Nong Song Hong